The  Annuity, Duchess of Mecklenburgh Strelitz Act 1843 (6 & 7 Vict c 25) is an Act of the Parliament of the United Kingdom.

In recognition of royal consent having been given to marriage between Princess Augusta of Cambridge and Frederick William, Hereditary Grand Duke of Mecklenburgh Strelitz, the Act provided for the grant of an annuity of £3000 per annum, payable quarterly from the death of her father, Prince Adolphus, Duke of Cambridge, which occurred in 1850, until the death of the Princess (which occurred in 1916).

The annuity was suspended in 1914 following the outbreak of World War I.

References
Halsbury's Statutes

External links

United Kingdom Acts of Parliament 1843